= Shtarbanov =

Shtarbanov (Bulgarian: Щърбанов) is a Bulgarian surname. Notable people with the surname include:

- Ilia Shtarbanov (1840 – 1918), Bulgarian revolutionary, teacher and politician
- Nedelcho Shtarbanov (1878–1913), Bulgarian actor
- Peter Shtarbanov (1836–1876), Bulgarian revolutionary
- Philip Shtarbanov (1841–1904), Bulgarian revolutionary
